Badminton was contested at the 2013 Summer Universiade from July 5 to 11 at the Tennis Academy in Kazan, Russia. Men's and women's singles, men's, women's, and mixed doubles, and mixed team events will be contested.

Medal summary

Medal table

Medal events

References

External links
2013 Summer Universiade – Badminton
Results book

2013
Universiade
2013 Summer Universiade events
Badminton tournaments in Russia